Tomás Gustavo Gil Guillén (April 19, 1939 – December 8, 2015) was a Venezuelan professional baseball player. He played in Major League Baseball as a second baseman for the Cleveland Indians (1967) and Seattle Pilots / Milwaukee Brewers (1969–1971). He also played 19 seasons in the Venezuelan Professional Baseball League.

Playing career
Gil was a talented defensive specialist with a career fielding percentage that was eight points higher than the league average over the span of his playing career. Unfortunately, like many infielders of his time, Gil was a light hitter, and his major league career coincided with what has been called the second deadball era, when batting averages and run production in both leagues were at an unusually low level. He was signed as an amateur free agent by the Cincinnati Reds in 1959. He spent the next seven seasons playing in the minor leagues before being purchased by the Indians in 1966. He joined the Indians' major league club in 1967, at the age of 27.

Career highlights include a game-tying, two-run pinch hit double in the top of the ninth inning against the New York Yankees, then scored to put the Pilots ahead to stay, winning 5–4 (June 14, 1969); a walk-off, two-run double with two outs in the bottom of the ninth for the Brewers as they came from behind and defeated the Minnesota Twins, 4–3 (June 23, 1970); drove in both Milwaukee runs with a pair of sacrifice flies in a 2–1 win over the Kansas City Royals (July 5, 1970); hit the only home run of his major league career, a solo shot against Chicago White Sox left-hander Jim Magnuson (August 5, 1970). 

In between major league seasons, Gil also played winter baseball with the Industriales de Valencia, Navegantes del Magallanes and Cardenales de Lara clubs of the Venezuelan Professional Baseball League in a career spanning 19 seasons from 1959 to 1977.

In the 1970 Caribbean Series, he hit .387, scored four runs, and had a series-leading seven RBI, to help the Magallanes win the series, marking the first time a Venezuelan team had won the Caribbean title. In the 1973 Caribbean Series, Gil earned a spot on the series' All-Star team.

Career statistics
In a four-year major league career, Gil played in 221 games, accumulating 87 hits in 468 at bats for a .186 career batting average along with one home run, 37 runs batted in and an on-base percentage of .272. His performance as a fielder was much better, with 186 putouts, 192 assists and 36 double plays, but only five errors out of 383 total chances for a .982 fielding percentage.

Managing career
After his playing career, he served as manager for the Aguilas del Zulia in the Venezuelan Winter League in 1979. He also managed the Danville Suns in 1982, and the Bluefield Orioles in 1990 and 1991.

Honors
In 2008, Gil was inducted into the Venezuelan Baseball Hall of Fame.

Gil died in 2015 in Phoenix, Arizona, at the age of 76.

See also

List of players from Venezuela in Major League Baseball

References

External links

Retrosheet
Venezuelan Professional Baseball League

1939 births
2015 deaths
Albuquerque Dukes players
Buffalo Bisons (minor league) players
California Angels scouts
Cardenales de Lara players
Cleveland Indians players
Columbia Reds players
Denver Bears players
Evansville Triplets players
Geneva Redlegs players
Hawaii Islanders players
Industriales de Valencia players
Macon Peaches players
Major League Baseball infielders
Major League Baseball players from Venezuela
Mexican League baseball players
Milwaukee Brewers players
Minor league baseball managers
Missoula Timberjacks players
Navegantes del Magallanes players
Oklahoma City 89ers players
Baseball players from Caracas
Petroleros de Poza Rica players
Portland Beavers players
San Diego Padres (minor league) players
Seattle Angels players
Seattle Pilots players
Seattle Rainiers players
Venezuelan expatriate baseball players in Mexico
Venezuelan expatriate baseball players in the United States